KMJV (106.3 FM, "Luna") is a radio station broadcasting a Spanish adult contemporary music format. Licensed to Soledad, California, United States, the station is currently owned by California Ortiz & 2 Media, LLC.

References

External links
 

MJV
MJV